Millennium Edition was the umbrella title of 62 one-shot comic books published by DC Comics in 2000 and 2001. It reprinted key issues from the history of the company such as the first appearance of notable characters, the relaunch of existing characters, or the start of major storylines. The oldest issue reprinted was Detective Comics #1 (March 1937) and the most recent was JLA #1 (January 1997). Each issue of Millennium Edition had a gold foil logo stamped onto the front cover and a brief essay on the inside covers detailing the significance of the issue reprinted.

The issues

See also
 List of DC Comics publications

Notes

References

External links

 Millennium Edition at Mike's Amazing World of DC Comics (with scans of covers)
 Millennium Edition: Mad #1 at RecalledComics.com

2000 comics debuts
2001 comics endings
DC Comics one-shots
DC Comics-related lists
DC Comics titles
Defunct American comics
Lists of comics by DC Comics